Emergenza is "the world's largest festival for unsigned bands, with concerts in more than 150 cities around the world." It features "up and coming bands from across the globe."

There are elimination rounds in different countries throughout the year, whereby the bands that advance are selected by the audiences that hear them. Emergenza judges choose the winners at regional and final concerts.

History
The first Emergenza Festival emerged in 1992, when a group of musician friends staged the first event in Rome, Italy, before an audience of 245. Five months later, the attendance had grown to three thousand, and in that year the festival's first compilation album was made.

From 1993 to 2003 Emergenza recorded 54 such albums, both live and in studio. In 1995 the Emergenza logo was created.

On January 7, 1996, the Gibus Club in Paris hosted the first Emergenza concert outside Italy. One hundred thirteen bands signed up. The following year 2,500 people attended the first Emergenza European Final at the London Astoria in the United Kingdom.

In 2001, the festival crossed the Atlantic Ocean to Montreal, and in 2002 five cities hosted Emergenza; by 2003 more than 700 bands were playing 190 engagements in the first U.S. season. The following year, 2,876 musicians took part in the United States, and some sixteen thousand played for audiences in Europe and Canada.  In 2005, seventy North American cities took part.

The Emergenza Festival spread to both Japan and Australia in 2006, with shows in Sydney, Melbourne, Adelaide and Tokyo. Later, Perth in Western Australia and Brisbane were included in Australia's list. From 2008 through 2010, The Czech Republic, Slovenia, Russia and New Zealand began participating.

International finals

2018

2017

2016

2015

2014

2013

2012

2011

2010

2009

2008

2007

2006

2005

2004

2003

2002

2001

2000 

No places were awarded this year.

References

External links
Emergenza Music Festival
 - The Standard
[Knuckles of Frisco]
Emergenza 2004 on The Mag
Taubertal Festival
 - Australian Magazine about Emergenza 1
Alex Munroe, "Gig to Help Unleash Mooroolbark's 3/4 Beast on World," Lilydale & Yarra Valley Leader, September 9, 2011
 - YouTube Interview with Emergenza Band

Music festivals staged internationally
Concert tours
Music festivals established in 1992